The 1820–21 United States House of Representatives elections were held on various dates in various states between July 3, 1820 and August 10, 1821. Each state set its own date for its elections to the House of Representatives before the first session of the 17th United States Congress convened on December 3, 1821. They coincided with President James Monroe winning reelection unopposed.

In March 1820, seven House seats transferred from Massachusetts to Maine after the latter seceded from the former to become a separate state. The size of the House then increased to 187 seats after Missouri achieved statehood in 1821.

The virtually nonpartisan Era of Good Feelings, a period of national political dominance by the Democratic-Republican Party, continued. Despite small gains, the Federalist Party remained relegated to limited state and local influence.

Election summaries 
One seat was added during this Congress for the new State of Missouri

Special elections 

There were special elections in 1820 and 1821 to the 16th United States Congress and 17th United States Congress.

Special elections are sorted by date then district.

16th Congress 

|-
! 
| James Pleasants
|  | Democratic-Republican
| 1817
|  | Incumbent resigned December 14, 1819, when elected U.S. Senator.New member elected January 3, 1820.Democratic-Republican hold.Successor seated January 18, 1820.Successor later re-elected in the April 1821 election to the next term, see below.
| nowrap | 

|-
! 
| John Condit
|  | Democratic-Republican
| 1818
|  | Incumbent resigned November 4, 1819, to become assistant collector of the Port of New York.New member elected  February 2, 1820.Democratic-Republican hold.Successor seated February 16, 1820.Successor was not a candidate in the November 7, 1820, election for the next term, see below.
| nowrap | 

|-
! 
| George F. Strother
|  | Democratic-Republican
| 1817
|  | Incumbent resigned February 10, 1820, to become as Receiver of Public Monies in St. Louis, Missouri.New member elected in August 1820.Democratic-Republican hold.Successor seated November 13, 1820.Successor later re-elected in the April 1821 election to the next term, see below.
| nowrap | 

|-
! 
| William Woodbridge
|  | Unknown
| 1819
|  | Incumbent resigned August 9, 1820, due to family illness.New delegate elected sometime in 1820.Successor seated November 20, 1820.Successor later re-elected, see below.
| nowrap | 

|-
! 
| James Pindall
|  | Federalist
| 1817
|  | Incumbent resigned July 6, 1820.New member elected sometime in 1820.Democratic-Republican gain.Successor seated November 13, 1820.Successor later re-elected in the April 1821 election to the next term, see below.
| nowrap | 

|-
! 
| James Johnson
|  | Democratic-Republican
| 1813
|  | Incumbent resigned when appointed as collector of customs in Norfolk.New member elected sometime in 1820.Democratic-Republican hold.Successor seated November 13, 1820.Successor later lost re-election in the April 1821 election to the next term, see below.
| nowrap | 

|-
! 
| Tunstall Quarles
|  | Democratic-Republican
| 1816
|  | Incumbent resigned June 15, 1820.New member elected August 7, 1820.Democratic-Republican hold.Successor was also elected to the next term, see below.Successor seated November 13, 1820.
| nowrap | 

|-
! 
| David Walker
|  | Democratic-Republican
| 1816
|  | Incumbent died March 1, 1820.New member elected August 7, 1820.Democratic-Republican hold.Successor was also elected to the next term, see below.Successor seated November 13, 1820.
| nowrap | 

|-
! 
| Edward Dowse
|  | Democratic-Republican
| 1818
|  | Incumbent resigned.New member elected August 21, 1820.Democratic-Republican hold.Successor later re-elected in the November 6, 1820, election to the next term, see below.Successor seated November 13, 1820.
| nowrap | 

|-
! 
| David Fullerton
|  | Democratic-Republican
| 1818
|  | Incumbent resigned May 15, 1820.New member elected October 10, 1820.Federalist gain.Successor was not a candidate in the same day's election for the next term, see below.Successor seated November 13, 1820.
| nowrap | 

|-
! 
| Jonathan Mason
|  | Federalist
| 1817 
|  | Incumbent resigned May 15, 1820, to pursue his law practice.New member elected on the second ballot November 6, 1820.Democratic-Republican gain.Successor also elected the same day to the next term, see below.Successor seated November 27, 1820.
| nowrap | 

|-
! 
| John Holmes
|  | Democratic-Republican
| 1816
| nowrap | 

|-
! 
| Zabdiel Sampson
|  | Democratic-Republican
| 1817
|  | Incumbent resigned July 26, 1820.New member elected November 24, 1820 on the second ballot.Successor seated December 18, 1820.Successor was already elected to the next term, see below.
| nowrap | 

|-
! 
| Joseph Hiester
|  | Democratic-Republican
| 17981804 1814
|  | Incumbent resigned in December 1820 when elected Governor of Pennsylvania.New member elected December 10, 1820.Democratic-Republican hold.Successor had not been a candidate in the October 10, 1820, election for the next term, see below.Successor seated January 8, 1821.
| nowrap | 

|-
! 
| Jesse Slocumb
|  | Democratic-Republican
| 1817
|  | Incumbent died December 20, 1820.New member elected February 7, 1821.Democratic-Republican hold.Successor seated February 7, 1821.Successor later re-elected in the August 9, 1821, election to the next term, see below.
| nowrap | 

|}

17th Congress 

|-
! 
| George Robertson
|  | Democratic-Republican
| 1816
|  | Incumbent resigned sometime before the start of the new Congress.New member elected August 6, 1821.Democratic-Republican hold.Successor seated December 3, 1821.
| nowrap | 

|-
! 
| John Linn
|  | Democratic-Republican
| 1816
|  | Incumbent died January 5, 1821.New member elected October 8, 1821.Democratic-Republican hold.Successor seated December 3, 1821.
| nowrap | 

|-
! 
| John C. Wright
|  | Democratic-Republican
| 1818
|  | Incumbent member-elect declined to serve in the next term and resigned March 3, 1821.New member elected October 9, 1821.Democratic-Republican hold.Successor seated December 3, 1821.
| nowrap | 

|-
! 
| James Duncan
|  | Democratic-Republican
| 1820
|  | Incumbent resigned in April 1821.New member elected October 9, 1821.Democratic-Republican hold.Successor seated December 12, 1821.
| nowrap | 

|-
! 
| William Cox Ellis
|  | Federalist
| 1820
|  | Incumbent resigned July 20, 1821.New member elected October 9, 1821.Democratic-Republican hold.Successor seated December 12, 1821.
| nowrap | 

|-
! 
| Selah Tuthill
|  | Democratic-Republican
| 1821
|  | Incumbent died September 7, 1821.New member elected November 6–8, 1821.Democratic-Republican hold.Successor seated December 3, 1821.
| nowrap | 

|-
! 
| John S. Richards
|  | Democratic-Republican
| 1820
|  | Member-elect declined to serve.New member elected sometime in 1821.Democratic-Republican hold.Successor seated December 3, 1821.
| nowrap | 

|-
! 
| Wingfield Bullock
|  | Democratic-Republican
| 1820
|  | Incumbent died October 13, 1821.New member elected November 22, 1821.Democratic-Republican hold.Successor seated January 2, 1822.
| nowrap | 

|}

Alabama 

Alabama elected its member August 5–6, 1821, after the term began but before the new Congress convened.

|-
! 
| John Crowell
|  | Democratic-Republican
| 1819
|  | Incumbent retired.New member elected.Democratic-Republican hold.
| nowrap | 

|}

Arkansas Territory 
See Non-voting delegates, below.

Connecticut 

Connecticut elected its members April 2, 1821, after the term began but before the new Congress convened.

|-
! rowspan=7 | 
| James Stevens
|  | Democratic-Republican
| 1818
|  | Incumbent retired.New member elected.Democratic-Republican hold.
| rowspan=7 nowrap | 

|-
| Jonathan O. Moseley
|  | Democratic-Republican
| 1804
|  | Incumbent retired.New member elected.Democratic-Republican hold.

|-
| Gideon Tomlinson
|  | Democratic-Republican
| 1818
| Incumbent re-elected.

|-
| Elisha Phelps
|  | Democratic-Republican
| 1818
|  | Incumbent lost re-election.New member elected.Democratic-Republican hold.

|-
| John Russ
|  | Democratic-Republican
| 1818
| Incumbent re-elected.

|-
| Henry W. Edwards
|  | Democratic-Republican
| 1818
| Incumbent re-elected.

|-
| Samuel A. Foot
|  | Democratic-Republican
| 1818
|  | Incumbent lost re-election.New member elected.Democratic-Republican hold.

|}

Delaware 

Delaware elected its members October 3, 1820.

|-
! rowspan=2 | 
| Louis McLane
|  | Federalist
| 1816
| Incumbent re-elected.
| rowspan=2 nowrap | 

|-
| Willard Hall
|  | Democratic-Republican
| 1816
|  | Incumbent lost re-election.New member elected.Democratic-Republican hold.

|}

Georgia 

Georgia elected its members October 2, 1820.

|-
! rowspan=6 | 
| Robert R. Reid
|  | Democratic-Republican
| 1819 
| Incumbent re-elected.
| rowspan=6 nowrap | 

|-
| Joel Crawford
|  | Democratic-Republican
| 1816
|  | Incumbent retired.New member elected.Democratic-Republican hold.

|-
| Joel Abbot
|  | Democratic-Republican
| 1816
| Incumbent re-elected.

|-
| John A. Cuthbert
|  | Democratic-Republican
| 1818
|  | Incumbent retired.New member elected.Democratic-Republican hold.

|-
| William Terrell
|  | Democratic-Republican
| 1816
|  | Incumbent retired.New member elected.Democratic-Republican hold.

|-
| Thomas W. Cobb
|  | Democratic-Republican
| 1818
|  | Incumbent lost re-election.New member elected.Democratic-Republican hold.

|}

Illinois 

Illinois elected its member August 7, 1820.

|-
! 
| Daniel P. Cook
|  | Democratic-Republican
| 1819
| Incumbent re-elected.
| nowrap | 

|}

Indiana 

Indiana elected its member August 7, 1820.

|-
! 
| William Hendricks
|  | Democratic-Republican
| 1817
| Incumbent re-elected.
| nowrap | 

|}

Kentucky 

Kentucky elected its members August 7, 1820.

|-
! 
| David Trimble
|  | Democratic-Republican
| 1816
| Incumbent re-elected.
| nowrap | 

|-
! 
| Henry Clay
|  | Democratic-Republican
| 18101814 18141815 (Seat declared vacant)1815 
|  | Incumbent retired.New member elected.Democratic-Republican hold.
| nowrap | 

|-
! 
| William Brown
|  | Democratic-Republican
| 1818
|  | Incumbent retired.New member elected.Democratic-Republican hold.
| nowrap | 

|-
! 
| Thomas Metcalfe
|  | Democratic-Republican
| 1818
| Incumbent re-elected.
| nowrap | 

|-
! 
| Alney McLean
|  | Democratic-Republican
| 18141816 1818
|  | Incumbent retired.New member elected.Democratic-Republican hold.
| nowrap | 

|-
! 
| David Walker
|  | Democratic-Republican
| 1816
|  | Incumbent died March 1, 1820.New member elected.Democratic-Republican hold.Successor also elected to finish the term.
| nowrap | 

|-
! 
| George Robertson
|  | Democratic-Republican
| 1816
| Incumbent re-elected.Incumbent resigned sometime before the start of the new Congress, leading to an August 6, 1821 special election.
| nowrap | 

|-
! 
| Richard C. Anderson Jr.
|  | Democratic-Republican
| 1816
|  | Incumbent retired.New member elected.Democratic-Republican hold.Successor died October 13, 1821, leading to a November 22, 1821 special election.
| nowrap | 

|-
! 
| Tunstall Quarles
|  | Democratic-Republican
| 1816
|  | Incumbent resigned June 15, 1820.New member elected.Democratic-Republican hold.Successor also elected to finish the term.
| nowrap | 

|-
! 
| Benjamin Hardin
|  | Democratic-Republican
| 18141816 1818
| Incumbent re-elected.
| nowrap | 

|}

Louisiana 

Louisiana elected its member July 3–5, 1820.

|-
! 
| Thomas Butler
|  | Democratic-Republican
| 1818
|  | Incumbent lost renomination.New member elected.Democratic-Republican hold.
| nowrap | 

|}

Maine 

This was the first election in Maine since its separation from Massachusetts. In the previous election, Massachusetts had had 20 representatives. Seven seats (representing the -) were reassigned from Massachusetts to Maine. In addition, under the terms of the law which admitted Maine to the union, any vacancies in the 16th Congress by Representatives elected to represent Massachusetts but residing in the new states of Maine would be filled by a resident of Maine. John Holmes, who had been elected to the House for the former  was elected as one of the first two senators for Maine. The vacancy was filled in a special election by Joseph Dane (Federalist). Dane was the only Representative officially considered as representing Maine in the 16th Congress. The Representatives from the 15th-20th districts were still classified as being from Massachusetts for the remainder of the 16th Congress.

Maine elected its members on November 7, 1820. State law required a majority to win an election, necessitating additional ballots if a majority was not received.  And, in fact, additional ballots were held on January 22, 1821, and September 10, 1821, after the term began but before the new Congress convened.

|-
! 
| Joseph Dane
|  | Federalist
| 1820 
| Incumbent re-elected.
| nowrap | 

|-
! 
| Ezekiel Whitman
|  | Federalist
| 18081810 1816
| Incumbent re-elected.
| nowrap | 

|-
! 
| Mark Langdon Hill
|  | Democratic-Republican
| 1819
| Incumbent re-elected on the second ballot.
| nowrap | 

|-
! 
| Martin Kinsley
|  | Democratic-Republican
| 1819
|  | Incumbent lost re-election.New member elected on the third ballot after the beginning of the term but before Congress convened.Democratic-Republican hold.
| nowrap | 

|-
! 
| James Parker
|  | Democratic-Republican
| 18131814 1819
|  | Incumbent lost re-election.New member elected on the third ballot after the beginning of the term but before Congress convened.Democratic-Republican hold.
| nowrap | 

|-
! 
| Joshua Cushman
|  | Democratic-Republican
| 1818
| Incumbent re-elected.
| nowrap | 

|-
! 
| Enoch Lincoln
|  | Democratic-Republican
| 1818 
| Incumbent re-elected.
| nowrap | 

|}

Maryland 

Maryland elected its members October 2, 1820.

|-
! 
| Raphael Neale
|  | Federalist
| 1818
| Incumbent re-elected.
| nowrap | 

|-
! 
| Joseph Kent
|  | Democratic-Republican
| 1818
| Incumbent re-elected.
| nowrap | 

|-
! 
| Henry R. Warfield
|  | Federalist
| 1818
| Incumbent re-elected.
| nowrap | 

|-
! 
| Samuel Ringgold
|  | Democratic-Republican
| 18101814 1816
|  | Incumbent retired.New member elected.Democratic-Republican hold.
| nowrap | 

|-
! rowspan=2 | 
| Samuel Smith
|  | Democratic-Republican
| 17921803 1816
| Incumbent re-elected.
| rowspan=2 nowrap | 

|-
| Peter Little
|  | Democratic-Republican
| 18101812 1816
| Incumbent re-elected.

|-
! 
| Stevenson Archer
|  | Democratic-Republican
| 1811 1816 1818
|  | Incumbent retired.New member elected by lot after tied vote.Democratic-Republican hold.
| nowrap | 

|-
! 
| Thomas Culbreth
|  | Democratic-Republican
| 1816
|  | Incumbent lost re-election.New member elected.Democratic-Republican hold.
| nowrap | 

|-
! 
| Thomas Bayly
|  | Federalist
| 1816
| Incumbent re-elected.
| nowrap | 

|}

Massachusetts 

This was the first election in Massachusetts after the separation of the former District of Maine as the new State of Maine, taking the old  –  districts with it.

Massachusetts elected its members November 6, 1820. Massachusetts had a majority requirement for election, which was not met in the  necessitating two additional elections on January 8, 1821, and April 16, 1821, after the term began but before the new Congress convened.

District numbers differed between source used and elsewhere on Wikipedia; district numbers used elsewhere on Wikipedia used here.

|-
! 
| Jonathan Mason
|  | Federalist
| 1817 
|  | Incumbent resigned May 15, 1820, to pursue his law practice.New member elected.Democratic-Republican gain.Successor also elected the same day to finish the term.
| nowrap | 

|-
! 
| Nathaniel Silsbee
|  | Democratic-Republican
| 1816
|  | Incumbent retired.New member elected late on the third ballot after the term began but before the Congress convened.Democratic-Republican hold.
| nowrap | 

|-
! 
| Jeremiah Nelson
|  | Federalist
| 18041806 1814
| Incumbent re-elected.
| nowrap | 

|-
! 
| Timothy Fuller
|  | Democratic-Republican
| 1816
| Incumbent re-elected.
| nowrap | 

|-
! 
| Samuel Lathrop
|  | Federalist
| 1819
| Incumbent re-elected.
| nowrap | 

|-
! 
| Samuel C. Allen
|  | Federalist
| 1816
| Incumbent re-elected.
| nowrap | 

|-
! 
| Henry Shaw
|  | Democratic-Republican
| 1816
|  | Incumbent retired.New member elected.Federalist gain.
| nowrap | 

|-
! 
| Zabdiel Sampson
|  | Democratic-Republican
| 1816
|  | Incumbent resigned July 26, 1820.New member elected.Democratic-Republican hold.
| nowrap | 

|-
! 
| Walter Folger Jr.
|  | Democratic-Republican
| 1816
|  | Incumbent lost re-election.New member elected.Federalist gain.
| nowrap | 

|-
! 
| Marcus Morton
|  | Democratic-Republican
| 1816
|  | Incumbent lost re-election.New member elected.Federalist gain 
| nowrap | 

|-
! 
| Benjamin Adams
|  | Federalist
| 1816
|  | Incumbent lost re-election.New member elected.Democratic-Republican gain.
| nowrap | 

|-
! 
| Jonas Kendall
|  | Federalist
| 1818
|  | Incumbent lost re-election.New member elected.Federalist hold.
| nowrap | 

|-
! 
| William Eustis
|  | Democratic-Republican
| 18001804 1820 
| Incumbent re-elected.
| nowrap | 

|}

Michigan Territory 
See Non-voting delegates, below.

Mississippi 

Mississippi elected its member August 7–8, 1820.

|-
! 
| Christopher Rankin
|  | Democratic-Republican
| 1819
| Incumbent re-elected.
| nowrap | 

|}

Missouri 

Missouri was admitted to the union on August 10, 1821, but elections had been held August 28, 1820.

|-
! 
| colspan=3 | None (District created)
|  | New seat.Territorial delegate re-elected as new member.Democratic-Republican gain.
| nowrap | 

|}

New Hampshire 

New Hampshire elected its members August 18, 1820.

|-
! rowspan=6 | 
| Josiah Butler
|  | Democratic-Republican
| 1816
| Incumbent re-elected.
| rowspan=6 nowrap | 

|-
| Nathaniel Upham
|  | Democratic-Republican
| 1816
| Incumbent re-elected.

|-
| Clifton Clagett
|  | Democratic-Republican
| 18021804 1816
|  | Incumbent lost re-election.New member elected.Democratic-Republican hold.

|-
| Joseph Buffum Jr.
|  | Democratic-Republican
| 1819
|  | Incumbent retired.New member elected.Democratic-Republican hold.

|-
| William Plumer Jr.
|  | Democratic-Republican
| 1819
| Incumbent re-elected.

|-
| Arthur Livermore
|  | Democratic-Republican
| 1816
|  | Incumbent lost re-election.New member elected.Democratic-Republican hold.

|}

New Jersey 

New Jersey elected its members November 7, 1820. There were an unusually large number of candidates, 119 candidates according to one contemporary newspaper. Some candidates ran under an "Anti-Caucus" ticket. Only 1 of the 6 six incumbents would serve in the next term, as 4 retired and 1 died after re-election.

|-
! rowspan=6 | 
| Ephraim Bateman
|  | Democratic-Republican
| 1814
| Incumbent re-elected.
| rowspan=6 nowrap | 

|-
| John Linn
|  | Democratic-Republican
| 1816
| Incumbent re-elected but died January 5, 1821, leading to an October 8, 1821 special election.

|-
| Bernard Smith
|  | Democratic-Republican
| 1818
|  | Incumbent retired.New member elected.Democratic-Republican hold.

|-
| Henry Southard
|  | Democratic-Republican
| 1814
|  | Incumbent retired.New member elected.Democratic-Republican hold.

|-
| Joseph Bloomfield
|  | Democratic-Republican
| 1816
|  | Incumbent retired.New member elected.Democratic-Republican hold.

|-
| Charles Kinsey
|  | Democratic-Republican
| 18161818 1820 
|  | Incumbent retired.New member elected.Democratic-Republican hold.

|}

New York 

New York elected its members April 24–26, 1821, after the term began but before the new Congress convened.

The Democratic-Republican party in New York was divided between "Bucktails" and "Clintonians". The Clintonians ran on a joint ticket with the remaining Federalists. In a few cases, marked as "Clintonian/Federalist" below, it is unclear whether a candidate on the joint ticket was Democratic-Republican or Federalist.

Only five of the twenty-seven incumbents were re-elected to the next term. Sixteen incumbents retired and five lost re-election. Despite this high turnover of membership, there was only a one-seat net gain for the Federalists.

|-
! rowspan=2 | 
| Silas Wood
|  | Federalist
| 1818
| Incumbent re-elected.
| rowspan=2 nowrap | 

|-
| James Guyon Jr.
|  | Democratic-Republican
| 1818
|  | Incumbent retired.New member elected.Democratic-Republican hold.

|-
! rowspan=2 | 
| Henry Meigs
|  | Democratic-Republican
| 1818
|  | Incumbent retired.New member elected.Democratic-Republican hold.
| rowspan=2 nowrap | 

|-
| Peter H. Wendover
|  | Democratic-Republican
| 1814
|  | Incumbent retired.New member elected.Democratic-Republican hold.

|-
! 
| Caleb Tompkins
|  | Democratic-Republican
| 1816
|  | Incumbent retired.New member elected.Democratic-Republican hold.
| nowrap | 

|-
! 
| Randall S. Street
|  | Federalist
| 1818
|  | Incumbent retired.New member elected.Democratic-Republican gain.
| nowrap | 

|-
! 
| James Strong
|  | Federalist
| 1818
|  | Incumbent retired.New member elected.Federalist hold.
| nowrap | 

|-
! 
| Walter Case
|  | Democratic-Republican
| 1818
|  | Incumbent retired.New member elected.Democratic-Republican hold.Successor died September 7, 1821, before the Congress convened, leading to a November 6–8, 1821 special election.
| nowrap | 

|-
! 
| Jacob H. De Witt
|  | Democratic-Republican
| 1818
|  | Incumbent retired.New member elected.Federalist gain.
| nowrap | 

|-
! 
| Robert Clark
|  | Democratic-Republican
| 1818
|  | Incumbent retired.New member elected.Democratic-Republican hold.
| nowrap | 

|-
! 
| Solomon Van Rensselaer
|  | Federalist
| 1818
| Incumbent re-elected.
| nowrap | 

|-
! 
| John D. Dickinson
|  | Federalist
| 1818
| Incumbent re-elected.
| nowrap | 

|-
! 
| John W. Taylor
|  | Democratic-Republican
| 1812
| Incumbent re-elected.
| nowrap | 

|-
! rowspan=2 | 
| Nathaniel Pitcher
|  | Democratic-Republican
| 1818
| Incumbent re-elected.
| rowspan=2 nowrap | 

|-
| Ezra C. Gross
|  | Democratic-Republican
| 1818
|  | Incumbent lost re-election.New member elected.Democratic-Republican hold.

|-
! 
| Harmanus Peek
|  | Democratic-Republican
| 1818
|  | Incumbent retired.New member elected.Democratic-Republican hold.
| nowrap | 

|-
! 
| John Fay
|  | Democratic-Republican
| 1818
|  | Incumbent retired.New member elected.Democratic-Republican hold.
| nowrap | 

|-
! rowspan=2 | 
| Robert Monell
|  | Democratic-Republican
| 1818
|  | Incumbent lost re-election.New member elected.Democratic-Republican hold.
| rowspan=2 nowrap | 

|-
| Joseph S. Lyman
|  | Democratic-Republican
| 1818
|  | Incumbent retired.New member elected.Democratic-Republican hold.

|-
! 
| Henry R. Storrs
|  | Federalist
| 1816
|  | Incumbent retired.New member elected.Federalist hold.
| nowrap | 

|-
! 
| Aaron Hackley Jr.
|  | Democratic-Republican
| 1818
|  | Incumbent retired.New member elected.Democratic-Republican hold.
| nowrap | 

|-
! 
| William D. Ford
|  | Democratic-Republican
| 1818
|  | Incumbent retired.New member elected.Federalist gain.
| nowrap | 

|-
! 
| George Hall
|  | Democratic-Republican
| 1818
|  | Incumbent lost re-election.New member elected.Democratic-Republican hold.
| nowrap | 

|-
! rowspan=2 | 
| Jonathan Richmond
|  | Democratic-Republican
| 1818
|  | Incumbent lost re-election.New member elected.Democratic-Republican hold.
| rowspan=2 nowrap | 

|-
| Caleb Baker
|  | Democratic-Republican
| 1818
|  | Incumbent retired.New member elected.Democratic-Republican hold.

|-
! 
| Nathaniel Allen
|  | Democratic-Republican
| 1818
|  | Incumbent lost re-election.New member elected.Democratic-Republican hold.
| nowrap | 

|-
! 
| Albert H. Tracy
|  | Democratic-Republican
| 1818
| Incumbent re-elected.
| nowrap | 

|}

North Carolina 

North Carolina elected its members August 9, 1821, after the term began but before the new Congress convened.

|-
! 
| Lemuel Sawyer
|  | Democratic-Republican
| 18061813 1817
| Incumbent re-elected.
| nowrap | 

|-
! 
| Hutchins G. Burton
|  | Democratic-Republican
| 1819
| Incumbent re-elected.
| nowrap | 

|-
! 
| Thomas H. Hall
|  | Democratic-Republican
| 1817
| Incumbent re-elected.
| nowrap | 

|-
! 
| William S. Blackledge
|  | Federalist
| 1821 
|  | Incumbent re-elected.
| nowrap | 

|-
! 
| Charles Hooks
|  | Democratic-Republican
| 1816 1817 1819
| Incumbent re-elected.
| nowrap | 

|-
! 
| Weldon N. Edwards
|  | Democratic-Republican
| 1816 
| Incumbent re-elected.
| nowrap | 

|-
! 
| John Culpepper
|  | Federalist
| 18061808 (Contested election)1808 18131816 1819
|  | Incumbent lost re-election.New member elected.Federalist hold.
| nowrap | 

|-
! 
| James S. Smith
|  | Democratic-Republican
| 1817
|  | Incumbent retired.New member elected.Democratic-Republican hold.
| nowrap | 

|-
! 
| Thomas Settle
|  | Democratic-Republican
| 1817
|  | Incumbent retired.New member elected.Democratic-Republican hold.
| nowrap | 

|-
! 
| Charles Fisher
|  | Democratic-Republican
| 1819 
|  | Incumbent retired.New member elected.Democratic-Republican hold.
| nowrap | 

|-
! 
| William Davidson
|  | Federalist
| 1818 
|  | Incumbent lost re-election.New member elected.Democratic-Republican gain.
| nowrap | 

|-
! 
| Felix Walker
|  | Democratic-Republican
| 1817
| Incumbent re-elected.
| nowrap | 

|-
! 
| Lewis Williams
|  | Democratic-Republican
| 1815
| Incumbent re-elected.
| nowrap | 

|}

Ohio 

Ohio elected its members October 10, 1820.

|-
! 
| Thomas R. Ross
|  | Democratic-Republican
| 1818
| Incumbent re-elected.
| nowrap | 

|-
! 
| John W. Campbell
|  | Democratic-Republican
| 1816
| Incumbent re-elected.
| nowrap | 

|-
! 
| Henry Brush
|  | Democratic-Republican
| 1818
|  | Incumbent lost re-election.New member elected.Democratic-Republican hold.
| nowrap | 

|-
! 
| Samuel Herrick
|  | Democratic-Republican
| 1816
|  | Incumbent retired.New member elected.Democratic-Republican hold.Winner declined to serve, leading to an October 9, 1821 special election.
| nowrap | 

|-
! 
| Philemon Beecher
|  | Federalist
| 1816
|  | Incumbent lost re-election.New member elected.Democratic-Republican gain.
| nowrap | 

|-
! 
| John Sloane
|  | Democratic-Republican
| 1818
| Incumbent re-elected.
| nowrap | 

|}

Pennsylvania 

Pennsylvania elected its members October 10, 1820.

|-
! rowspan=4 | 
| Joseph Hemphill
|  | Federalist
| 18001802 1818
| Incumbent re-elected.
| rowspan=4 nowrap | 

|-
| Samuel Edwards
|  | Federalist
| 1818
| Incumbent re-elected.

|-
| Thomas Forrest
|  | Federalist
| 1818
|  | Incumbent lost re-election.New member elected.Federalist hold.

|-
| John Sergeant
|  | Federalist
| 1815 
| Incumbent re-elected.

|-
! rowspan=2 | 
| William Darlington
|  | Democratic-Republican
| 18141816 1818
| Incumbent re-elected.
| rowspan=2 nowrap | 

|-
| Samuel Gross
|  | Democratic-Republican
| 1818
| Incumbent re-elected.

|-
! rowspan=2 | 
| James M. Wallace
|  | Democratic-Republican
| 1815 
|  | Incumbent lost re-election.New member elected.Federalist gain.
| rowspan=2 nowrap | 

|-
| Jacob Hibshman
|  | Democratic-Republican
| 1818
|  | Incumbent lost re-election.New member elected.Federalist gain.

|-
! 
| Jacob Hostetter
|  | Democratic-Republican
| 1818
|  | Incumbent lost re-election.New member elected.Democratic-Republican hold.
| nowrap | 

|-
! rowspan=2 | 
| Andrew Boden
|  | Democratic-Republican
| 1816
|  | Incumbent retired.New member elected.Democratic-Republican hold.
| rowspan=2 nowrap | 

|-
| David Fullerton
|  | Democratic-Republican
| 1818
|  | Incumbent resigned May 15, 1820.New member elected.Democratic-Republican hold.Successor was not a candidate in the same day's election to finish the term.Successor resigned in April 1821, leading to an October 9, 1821 special election.

|-
! rowspan=2 | 
| Samuel Moore
|  | Democratic-Republican
| 1818
| Incumbent re-elected.
| rowspan=2 nowrap | 

|-
| Thomas J. Rogers
|  | Democratic-Republican
| 1818 
| Incumbent re-elected.

|-
! 
| Joseph Hiester
|  | Democratic-Republican
| 17981804 1814
|  | Incumbent retired to run for Governor of Pennsylvania.New member elected.Federalist gain.Incumbent then resigned in December 1820 when elected Governor of Pennsylvania and successor lost the December 10, 1820 special election to finish the term.
| nowrap | 

|-
! 
| Robert Philson
|  | Democratic-Republican
| 1818
|  | Incumbent lost re-election.New member elected.Democratic-Republican hold.
| nowrap | 

|-
! 
| William P. Maclay
|  | Democratic-Republican
| 1816
|  | Incumbent lost re-election.New member elected.Democratic-Republican hold.
| nowrap | 

|-
! rowspan=2 | 
| George Denison
|  | Democratic-Republican
| 1818
| Incumbent re-elected.
| rowspan=2 nowrap | 

|-
| John Murray
|  | Democratic-Republican
| 1817 
|  | Incumbent retired.New member elected.Federalist gain.Incumbent resigned July 20, 1821, leading to an October 9, 1821 special election.

|-
! 
| David Marchand
|  | Democratic-Republican
| 1816
|  | Incumbent retired.New member elected.Democratic-Republican hold.
| nowrap | 

|-
! 
| Thomas Patterson
|  | Democratic-Republican
| 1816
| Incumbent re-elected.
| nowrap | 

|-
! 
| Christian Tarr
|  | Democratic-Republican
| 1816
|  | Incumbent lost re-election.New member elected.Democratic-Republican hold.
| nowrap | 

|-
! 
| Henry Baldwin
|  | Democratic-Republican
| 1816
| Incumbent re-elected.
| nowrap | 

|-
! 
| Robert Moore
|  | Democratic-Republican
| 1816
|  | Incumbent lost re-election.New member elected.Democratic-Republican hold.
| nowrap | 

|}

Rhode Island 

Rhode Island elected its members August 29, 1820.

|-
! rowspan=2 | 
| Samuel Eddy
|  | Democratic-Republican
| 1818
| Incumbent re-elected.
| rowspan=2 nowrap | 

|-
| Nathaniel Hazard
|  | Democratic-Republican
| 1818
|  | Incumbent lost re-election.New member elected.Democratic-Republican hold.Incumbent died December 17, 1820, and seat remained vacant until the end of term.

|}

South Carolina 

South Carolina elected its members October 9–10, 1820.

|-
! 
| Charles Pinckney
|  | Democratic-Republican
| 1818
|  | Incumbent retired.New member elected.Democratic-Republican hold.
| nowrap | 

|-
! 
| William Lowndes
|  | Democratic-Republican
| 1810
| Incumbent re-elected.
| nowrap | 

|-
! 
| James Ervin
|  | Democratic-Republican
| 1816
|  | Incumbent retired.New member elected.Democratic-Republican hold.
| nowrap | 

|-
! 
| James Overstreet
|  | Democratic-Republican
| 1818
| Incumbent re-elected.
| nowrap | 

|-
! 
| Starling Tucker
|  | Democratic-Republican
| 1816
| Incumbent re-elected.
| nowrap | 

|-
! 
| Eldred Simkins
|  | Democratic-Republican
| 1818 
|  | Incumbent retired.New member elected.Democratic-Republican hold.
| nowrap | 

|-
! 
| Elias Earle
|  | Democratic-Republican
| 18041814 1816
|  | Incumbent lost re-election.New member elected.Democratic-Republican hold.
| nowrap | 

|-
! 
| John McCreary
|  | Democratic-Republican
| 1818
|  | Incumbent lost re-election.New member elected.Democratic-Republican hold.
| nowrap | 

|-
! 
| Joseph Brevard
|  | Democratic-Republican
| 1818
|  | Incumbent retired.New member elected.Democratic-Republican hold.Winner declined to serve, leading to a special election sometime in 1821.
| nowrap | 

|}

Tennessee 

Tennessee elected its members August 9–10, 1821, after the term began but before the new Congress convened.

|-
! 
| John Rhea
|  | Democratic-Republican
| 18031815 1817
| Incumbent re-elected.
| nowrap | 

|-
! 
| John Cocke
|  | Democratic-Republican
| 1819
| Incumbent re-elected.
| nowrap | 

|-
! 
| Francis Jones
|  | Democratic-Republican
| 1817
| Incumbent re-elected.
| nowrap | 

|-
! 
| Robert Allen
|  | Democratic-Republican
| 1819
| Incumbent re-elected.
| nowrap | 

|-
! 
| Newton Cannon
|  | Democratic-Republican
| 1814 1817 1819
| Incumbent re-elected.
| nowrap | 

|-
! 
| Henry H. Bryan
|  | Democratic-Republican
| 1819
| Incumbent re-elected.Winner never appeared to take his seat.

| nowrap | 

|}

Vermont 

In 1820, Vermont returned to using districts. This would be the only election in which the  would be used.

Vermont elected its members September 5, 1820. A majority was required for election, which was not met in the 2nd or 3rd district, requiring additional ballots to achieve a majority. The 2nd district required 7 ballots. The 3rd district required two additional ballots. The additional ballots were held December 11, 1820, and February 19, May 1, July 2, September 4, and October 22, 1821.

|-
! 
| Rollin Carolas Mallary
|  | Democratic-Republican
| 1818
| Incumbent re-elected.
| nowrap | 

|-
! 
| Mark Richards
|  | Democratic-Republican
| 1816
|  | Incumbent lost re-election.New member elected on the seventh ballot.Democratic-Republican hold.
| nowrap | 

|-
! rowspan=2 | 
| Charles Rich
|  | Democratic-Republican
| 18121814 1816
| Incumbent re-elected on the third ballot.
| rowspan=2 nowrap | 

|-
| Ezra Meech
|  | Democratic-Republican
| 1818
|  | Incumbent lost re-election.Democratic-Republican loss.

|-
! 
| William Strong
|  | Democratic-Republican
| 18101814 1818
|  | Incumbent lost re-election.New member elected.Democratic-Republican hold.
| nowrap | 

|-
! 
| Samuel C. Crafts
|  | Democratic-Republican
| 1816
| Incumbent re-elected.
| nowrap | 

|-
! 
| colspan=3 | None (District created)
|  | New seat.New member elected.Democratic-Republican gain.
| nowrap | 

|}

Virginia 

Virginia elected its members in April 1821, after the term began but before the new Congress convened.

|-
! 
| Edward B. Jackson
|  | Democratic-Republican
| 1820 
| Incumbent re-elected.
| nowrap | 

|-
! 
| Thomas Van Swearingen
|  | Federalist
| 1819
| Incumbent re-elected.
| nowrap | 

|-
! 
| Jared Williams
|  | Democratic-Republican
| 1819
| Incumbent re-elected.
| nowrap | 

|-
! 
| William McCoy
|  | Democratic-Republican
| 1811
| Incumbent re-elected.
| nowrap | 

|-
! 
| John Floyd
|  | Democratic-Republican
| 1817
| Incumbent re-elected.
| nowrap | 

|-
! 
| Alexander Smyth
|  | Democratic-Republican
| 1817
| Incumbent re-elected.
| nowrap | 

|-
! 
| Ballard Smith
|  | Democratic-Republican
| 1815
|  | Incumbent retired.New member elected.Democratic-Republican hold.
| nowrap | 

|-
! 
| Charles F. Mercer
|  | Federalist
| 1817
| Incumbent re-elected.
| nowrap | 

|-
! 
| William Lee Ball
|  | Democratic-Republican
| 1817
| Incumbent re-elected.
| nowrap | 

|-
! 
| Thomas L. Moore
|  | Democratic-Republican
| 1820 
| Incumbent re-elected.
| nowrap | 

|-
! 
| Philip P. Barbour
|  | Democratic-Republican
| 1814 
| Incumbent re-elected.
| nowrap | 

|-
! 
| Robert S. Garnett
|  | Democratic-Republican
| 1817
| Incumbent re-elected.
| nowrap | 

|-
! 
| Severn E. Parker
|  | Democratic-Republican
| 1819
|  | Incumbent retired.New member elected.Democratic-Republican hold.
| nowrap | 

|-
! 
| William A. Burwell
|  | Democratic-Republican
| 1806 
|  | Incumbent retired.New member elected.Democratic-Republican hold.
| nowrap | 

|-
! 
| George Tucker
|  | Democratic-Republican
| 1819
| Incumbent re-elected.
| nowrap | 

|-
! 
| John Randolph
|  | Democratic-Republican
| 17991813 18151817 1819
| Incumbent re-elected.
| nowrap | 

|-
! 
| William S. Archer
|  | Democratic-Republican
| 1820 
| Incumbent re-elected.
| nowrap | 

|-
! 
| Mark Alexander
|  | Democratic-Republican
| 1819
| Incumbent re-elected.
| nowrap | 

|-
! 
| James Jones
|  | Democratic-Republican
| 1819
| Incumbent re-elected.
| nowrap | 

|-
! 
| John C. Gray
|  | Democratic-Republican
| 1820 
|  | Incumbent lost re-election.New member elected.Democratic-Republican hold.
| nowrap | 

|-
! 
| Thomas Newton Jr.
|  | Democratic-Republican
| 1797
| Incumbent re-elected.
| nowrap | 

|-
! 
| Hugh Nelson
|  | Democratic-Republican
| 1811
| Incumbent re-elected.
| nowrap | 

|-
! 
| John Tyler
|  | Democratic-Republican
| 1816 
|  | Incumbent retired.New member elected.Democratic-Republican hold.
| nowrap | 

|}

Non-voting delegates 

There were four territories that had the right to send a delegate to at least part of the 17th Congress, only three of which actually sent delegates. Missouri Territory's seat remained vacant, as the territory was admitted as the State of Missouri early in the 17th Congress.

|-
! 
| James Woodson Bates
|  | None
| 1819
| Incumbent re-elected.
| nowrap | 

|-
! 
| Solomon Sibley
|  | None
| 1820 
| Incumbent re-elected sometime in 1821.
| nowrap | 

|}

See also 
 1820 United States elections
 List of United States House of Representatives elections (1789–1822)
 1820 United States presidential election
 1820–21 United States Senate elections
 16th United States Congress
 17th United States Congress

Notes

References

Bibliography

External links 
 Office of the Historian (Office of Art & Archives, Office of the Clerk, U.S. House of Representatives)